Gaspare Cataldo (1902–1970) was an Italian screenwriter. In 1947 he awarded the Nastro d'Argento for Best Screenplay for his work on The Brothers Karamazov.

Selected filmography
 A Romantic Adventure (1940)
 One Hundred Thousand Dollars (1940)
 Honeymoon (1941)
 Love Story (1942)
 The Lovers (1946)
 Before Him All Rome Trembled (1946)
 The Brothers Karamazov (1947)
 Crime News (1947)
 Heart and Soul (1948)
 Twenty Years (1949)
 The Accusation (1950)
 Revenge of a Crazy Girl (1951)
 The Ungrateful Heart (1951)
 Four Red Roses (1951)
 We're Dancing on the Rainbow (1952)
 Genoese Dragnet (1952)
Ivan, Son of the White Devil (1953)
 Papà Pacifico (1954)
 Wives and Obscurities (1956)
 Akiko (1961)

References

Bibliography
 Tad Bentley Hammer. International film prizes: an encyclopedia. Garland, 1991.

External links

1902 births
1970 deaths
20th-century Italian screenwriters
People from Trapani